The Second Kishida Cabinet is the 101st Cabinet of Japan and was formed by Fumio Kishida, leader of the Liberal Democratic Party and Prime Minister of Japan.

The government is a coalition between the Liberal Democratic Party and the Komeito and controls both the upper and lower houses of the National Diet. It is the successor to Kishida's previous cabinet.

Background 
After Fumio Kishida called for a general election and won a supermajority on 31 October 2021, he was re-elected as the prime minister at a special session of the National Diet on 10 November 2021. As his first cabinet only served 37 days, the shortest term in history, Kishida reappointed nearly all of the ministers from the previous cabinet following re-election.

On 10 August 2022, the cabinet was reshuffled. 7 MPs with ties to the Unification Church were dismissed following the assassination of former Prime Minister Shinzo Abe and increasing media scrutiny of LDP officials' close ties with the church. On 20 August it was reported that 23 officials including 8 MPs in the new reshuffled cabinet have existing connections to the Unification Church.

Election of the Prime Minister

Changes 
 Foreign Minister Toshimitsu Motegi was replaced by Yoshimasa Hayashi, after being chosen as the new LDP Secretary-General due to the resignation of Akira Amari.

List of Ministers

Cabinet 
Citation of this table: List of Second Kishida Cabinet Members

Deputy Chief Cabinet Secretary and Director-General of the Cabinet Legislation Bureau

Special Adviser to the Prime Minister

State Ministers

Parliamentary Vice-Ministers

Reshuffled Cabinet

References

External links 
Pages at the Prime Minister's Official Residence of Japan (English website):
List of Ministers November 2021 – August 2022
List of Ministers August 2022 – 

Cabinet of Japan
2021 establishments in Japan
Cabinets established in 2021
2021 in Japanese politics